Tharavattamma is a 1966 Indian Malayalam-language drama film, directed by P. Bhaskaran and produced by N. Vasudevan. The film stars Sathyan, Sheela, Sukumari and Thikkurissy Sukumaran Nair. The film had musical score by M. S. Baburaj.

Plot

Cast 

Sathyan – Gopi
Sheela – Radha
Adoor Bhasi – Paramu Kurup
Bahadoor – Mr. Menon
Sukumari – Velamma
Thikkurissy Sukumaran Nair – Adv. Keshava Panicker
G. K. Pillai – Madhavankutty
K. P. Ummer – Suresh
Aranmula Ponnamma – Valyamma
B. S. Saroja – Geetha
P. J. Antony  -- Govinda Pilla
Prathapachandran
Vasanthi
P. R. Varalakshmi

Soundtrack 
The music was composed by M. S. Baburaj and the lyrics were written by P. Bhaskaran.

References

External links 
 

1960s Malayalam-language films
1966 drama films
1966 films
Films directed by P. Bhaskaran
Films scored by M. S. Baburaj
Indian drama films